John Yaremko,  (August 10, 1918 – August 7, 2010) was a politician in Ontario, Canada. He was a Progressive Conservative member of the Legislative Assembly of Ontario from 1951 until 1975 who represented the downtown Toronto riding of Bellwoods. He was the first Ukrainian-Canadian to be elected to the Ontario legislature.

Background
Yaremko was born in Welland, Ontario and educated in Hamilton, at the University of Toronto and at Osgoode Hall. He was called to the bar in 1946 and named a Queen's Counsel in 1953. He married Mary Materyn in 1945.

Politics
In the 1951 provincial election, Yaremko was named the Progressive Conservative candidate in Bellwoods in its successful bid to unseat incumbent A. A. MacLeod, one of only two Communist Labor-Progressive Party MPPs in the Ontario legislature.

Yaremko served in the provincial cabinet as Minister Without Portfolio in 1958, Minister of Transport from 1958 to 1960, Provincial Secretary and Registrar from 1960 to 1966, Minister of Public Welfare from 1966 to 1967, Minister of Social and Family Services from 1967 to 1971, Provincial Secretary and Minister of Citizenship from 1971 to 1972 and Solicitor General from 1972 to 1974.

Very active in the Ukrainian Canadian community he was a benefactor of many of its causes and in 2009 was the recipient of the first Senator Paul Yuzyk Award for his commitment to multiculturalism.

Cabinet positions

Later life
Yaremko served as chairman for the appeals tribunal for commercial liquor licenses for the province of Ontario from 1976 to 1985.

He died in Toronto on August 7, 2010.

References

Notes

Citations

External links 
 

1918 births
2010 deaths
People from Welland
Progressive Conservative Party of Ontario MPPs
Provincial Secretaries of Ontario
University of Toronto alumni
Canadian King's Counsel